TK Maxx is a subsidiary of the American apparel and home goods company TJX Companies based in Framingham, Massachusetts. The stores operate throughout the United Kingdom, Australia, Ireland, Germany, Poland, Austria and the Netherlands, totalling 596 stores in Europe (up from 515 in April 2017) and 56 in Australia in May 2020. In Poland, there are a total of 44 stores. The chain uses a slightly different name from that of the TJ Maxx stores in the United States, to avoid confusion with the British retailer T. J. Hughes.

History

In 1976, TJ Maxx was founded in Framingham, Massachusetts, United States, by Bernard Cammarata. The first international store opened in Bristol, UK, in 1994. The company modified the name to TK Maxx to avoid confusion with the established British retail chain T. J. Hughes (which is not affiliated with TJX).

In 2007, TK Maxx began winding down new store openings within the United Kingdom. Focus was given to revamping older inner city stores, or relocating them. This decision led to the creation of Maxx Maxx, moving from a budget reputation into a large department store format with a wider product range.

Opening of stores in the Netherlands between 1999 and 2001 was not as successful as the company wished. The first store in Germany opened on October 4, 2007, in Lübeck.

In August 2008, TK Maxx opened a store on Kensington High Street, London, England, its first central London store, on a site formerly occupied by Habitat. In the following year, TK Maxx became locked in a dispute over its plans to open a store at Piccadilly Circus, London. It had signed an agreement in February 2009 to occupy a  unit, formerly used by Virgin Megastores and later Zavvi, with a rent of £1.55 million per year.

The freehold to the land is owned by the Crown Estate which had the final decision over allowing the company to move in to the unit. The Crown Estate rejected the plans, saying that it did not fit in with the strategy it had for the site, which was meant to give the area an upmarket appeal.

The decision was met with condemnation from publicist Max Clifford, who launched a campaign in conjunction with Look to persuade the Crown Estate to allow the store to open in the unit. A court appeal by TK Maxx against the decision failed; Dutch retailer The Sting took the building as their first store in the United Kingdom.

In March 2009, the TK Maxx e-commerce site was launched, initially selling only handbags, but later also selling other accessories. In October 2015, the first Dutch store opened in Eindhoven. Followed by two more stores in Groningen and Rotterdam.

In April 2017, the brand was launched in Australia, when it took over the thirty five Trade Secret discount department stores. The stores opened in April in Brisbane, Sydney and Melbourne with stores in Cairns, Townsville, Toowoomba, Canberra, Newcastle, Wollongong, Albury, the Sunshine Coast and the Gold Coast by the end of May.

In November 2018, a mass brawl between hostile extended families took place at a TK Maxx outlet in Osnabrück, Germany, during Black Friday sales.

Charity work
In June 2007, TK Maxx was an active participant of UK Comic Relief, having been the sole retailer of the Red Nose Day T-shirts which generated £2 million for the Comic Relief cause. In June 2009, TK Maxx was again the sole retailer of the Red Nose Day T-shirts, with exclusive designs by Stella McCartney, raising a total of £3,200,589.

TK Maxx also worked with the Woodland Trust by starting to charge for plastic carrier bags in August 2008 and donating the proceeds to the Trust. The proceeds allowed the Woodland Trust to plant 30,000 new trees on a  site near Elmstead Market, Essex. The usage of carrier bags from TK Maxx dropped by 73% since the scheme was launched.

At the time, shops usually provided free carrier bags; since 2015 a charge, usually donated to charity, is required by law throughout the United Kingdom. Since 2004, TK Maxx has held a Christmas card recycling scheme in conjunction with the Trust. TK Maxx also runs a 'Give Up Clothes For Good' campaign, where customers are encouraged to bring in unwanted clothes for Cancer Research UK.

In Ireland, TK Maxx actively supports Enable Ireland, a charity which helps provide free services to children with disabilities.

Notes

References

External links

 

TJX Companies
Arts and crafts retailers
Retail companies established in 1994
Companies based in Framingham, Massachusetts
Clothing retailers of the United States
Clothing retailers of the United Kingdom
Companies based in Watford
Clothing retailers of Australia
Department stores of Australia